FK Loznica (Serbian Cyrillic: ФК Лозница) is a professional football club from Loznica, Serbia.

History

LSK
The first soccer ball arrived in the town of Loznica in 1919. It was brought from London by local student Milisav Vasić, who had been studying there, playing at Birmingham City F.C. Soon the game became very popular and at the end of 1919 the first club was founded, named Gučevo. Later the name was changed to LSK – Loznički Sportski Klub and was the direct predecessor of today's FK Loznica. During this period, the club did not play in any organized competitions, only friendly matches against other clubs from the neighboring towns of Zvornik, Bijeljina, Šabac or Valjevo. These matches were played on Sundays and many people usually came to attend, especially the local youth that loudly cheered for their club.

Trgovački
During the Second World War LSK changed its name to FK Trgovački and gathered the best players from Loznica. The club colours were green and white. The first president was a merchant Mr. Pavle Avramović. In 1942 another club FK Srbadija was formed. During these hard years of war, the football matches were the most important pastime for the citizens. Each time FK Mačva Šabac came to play, afterward a night event would be organised in the Vuk Karadžić Culture Center, a real celebration for that period. Besides Trgovački and Srbadija, a third club was created in Loznica, FK Gajret. Football was so popular that was possible to see that almost every street had a minor youth club where local children played. Even many elder people started playing. Loznica was liberated by Allied troops on September 23, 1944 and some matches between Partisans units played friendly matches against local clubs, many times even under enemy fire coming from across the river Drina where some rest of German troops returning from Greece were still stationed.

FK Jadar and finally FK Loznica
With the liberation of Loznica the reconstruction starts and the development in all areas begins again. The football stadium is completely reconstructed and renovated. The club changes its name to FK Jadar. The club starts competing in lower regional leagues. It is then finally renamed into FK Loznica. In 1949 another club is formed in Loznica, FK Proleter Loznica, and a huge rivalry bagins between the two clubs. A few years later FK Loznica will move from their earlier "Sokolana" field to a new one at "Lagator" where still plays today and where it has one of the best stadiums found in the region. During this period the club started celebrating its annual 7 February "Green&white evening".

1990s
The major club success was achieved in this period when under the presidents Mr. Nikola Ristivojević and Mr. Milan Josić and together with the help of private investors such as Mr. Dobrivoje Stojnić, an owner of the enterprise STOBEX, that facilitated the use of all construction equipment, made possible the creation of a modern stadium. Many other influential people from Loznica helped providing all necessary help. The club had received green light from the commission of the FR Yugoslav Football Association and FIFA officials for hosting international matches. The most astonishing fact was that the construction was made during summer and concluded in little less than two months. Many matches of the FR Yugoslav and Serbian under-21 teams were played there.

Clubs glorious period
With their new stadium club ambitions grew and with the help of renamed coaches such as Miroslav Milanović, Pero Slavkić and Đorđe Gerum the rise to the top league had begun. Initially, the qualification to the Second League and next to the First League of FR Yugoslavia was archived. Many great footballers had played in the squad. Their first top league match was played home against FK Budućnost Podgorica having been archived a 2–0 victory for the delirium of the home spectators. In this period beside the local crowd it was usual to see people coming from the cities of Šabac, Valjevo, Zvornik, Bijeljina and other places to cheer for the club. In a home match against famous Red Star and impressive 15,000 spectators were present having Loznica archived a prowd result of 2–2. In several occasions the former President of the Yugoslav and Serbia FA assisted the matches and in one occasion he said that "the Lagator was a small Wembley"!

Recent period
After these exciting period the club didn't manage to stay in top competition and suffered a series of relegations. In 2009 the club celebrates its 90th birthday. In summer 2008 the club achieved promotion. Some new generations of players look promising. The club's main supporters organisation, "Solunci", have regrouped again in numbers and are well organised. However, everyone in the club and all supporters dream to one day hear again the words of the legendary Loznica born journalist and radio commentator Mr. Božidar Kičević saying again the words he said on the radio while reporting the first FK Loznica top league match back in the 1990s, "Good morning First League"!

Players

Current squad

References

External links
 Official website
 Solunci supporters site. 

 
Football clubs in Serbia
Association football clubs established in 1919
Loznica
1919 establishments in Serbia